HMS Rapid was a destroyer of the M class that served with the Royal Navy during First World War. Launched by Thornycroft in 1916, the vessel was the one of two similar ships ordered as part of the Fifth War Construction Programme. They differed from the remainder of the M class in having more powerful engines. The design was used as the basis for the subsequent five ships of the  also built by the yard. Rapid served in escort and patrol roles, principally providing defence from submarines as part of the Grand Fleet until it was disbanded at the end of the War. After the end of hostilities, the vessel served in minor roles, including briefly as part of the Admiralty Compass Department in 1921 and 1924, but was sold to be scrapped in 1927.

Design

Rapid was one of two  destroyers ordered by the British Admiralty from John I. Thornycroft & Company in May 1915 as part of the Fifth War Construction Programme. Rapid and  differed from the Admiralty design in having more powerful engines, which gave them a higher potential speed. Thornycroft had previously delivered four other M-class destroyers to the Admiralty to slightly different specifications, and together they are considered to be a single class.

Displacement was  normal and  full load. Three funnels were fitted, the centre one being wider than the others, a feature shared with the R-class destroyers designed by Thornycroft.

Armament consisted of three single QF  Mk IV guns on the ship's centreline, with one on the forecastle, one aft and one between the second and third funnels. Four  torpedoes torpedoes were carried in two twin rotating mounts. By 1920, the ship was equipped with a single QF 2-pounder  "pom-pom" anti-aircraft gun. The vessel had a complement of 82 officers and ratings.

Service
Rapid was laid down on 12 August 1915 and launched on 15 July 1916. Once completed on 19 September 1916, the ship joined the Grand Fleet, initially with the Fifteenth Destroyer Flotilla. Occasionally, the vessel operated alone. On 17 May 1917, the ship rescued the survivors from the British armed merchantman Middlesex, which had been sunk by the German submarine  the previous day. In the process, Rapid was involved in a friendly fire incident when it mistook the British submarine , which was simultaneously approaching the lifeboats, for an enemy and subjected it to gunfire and a depth charge attack, albeit without sinking it.

The flotilla was also employed collectively in larger operations, although these sorties were also not always as successful. For example, during an anti-submarine patrol in the North Sea as part of a convoy run from Lerwick between 15 and 24 June 1917, Rapid  launched twelve attacks, none of which led to the destruction of any submarines. The destroyer was also employed on escort duties and it was during one these operations in the North Sea during August 1917 that Rapid, along with the destroyer , unsuccessfully attacked a fleeing German submarine. Rapid continued to serve with the Fifteenth Destroyer Flotilla until the end of the war.

When the Grand Fleet was disbanded, Rapid was kept on "miscellaneous service." In 1921, the ship was seconded to the Compass Department of the Admiralty, which had responsibility for many of the scientific instruments used on board ships of the Navy. The ship was then transferred to the Reserve Fleet at Portsmouth. During September 1924, the vessel was again seconded for compass trials, before again returning to reserve. In the interim, however, the Navy decided to scrap many of the older destroyers, up to and including some of the M-class, in preparation for the introduction of newer and larger vessels. Despite having little over a decade in service, Rapid was retired and sold to G Cohen for breaking up on 20 April 1927.

Pennant numbers

Notes

References

Citations

Bibliography

 
 
 

 
 
 
 
 
 
 

1916 ships
Ships built in Southampton
Thornycroft M-class destroyers
World War I destroyers of the United Kingdom